Adam Laurent (born July 6, 1971) is an American former cyclist. He competed in the men's team pursuit at the 1996 Summer Olympics.

References

External links

1971 births
Living people
American male cyclists
Olympic cyclists of the United States
Cyclists at the 1996 Summer Olympics
Sportspeople from Santa Cruz, California
Pan American Games medalists in cycling
Pan American Games gold medalists for the United States
Cyclists at the 1999 Pan American Games